Underground culture, or simply underground, is a term to describe various alternative cultures which either consider themselves different from the mainstream of society and culture, or are considered so by others. The word "underground" is used because there is a history of resistance movements under harsh regimes where the term underground was employed to refer to the necessary secrecy of the resisters.

For example, the Underground Railroad was a network of clandestine routes by which African slaves in the 19th century United States attempted to escape to freedom. The phrase "underground railroad" was resurrected and applied in the 1960s to the extensive network of draft counseling groups and houses used to help Vietnam-era draft dodgers escape to Canada, and was also applied in the 1970s to the clandestine movement of people and goods by the American Indian Movement in and out of occupied Native American reservation lands. (See Wounded Knee).

The filmmaker Rosa von Praunheim documented the legendary New York underground scene in the 1970s around Andy Warhol in some of his films, for example in Underground and Emigrants (1976) and Tally Brown, New York (1979).

Since then, the term has come to designate various subcultures such as mod culture, hippie culture, punk culture, techno music/rave culture and underground hip hop.

Terminology
The unmodified term "The underground" was a common name for World War II resistance movements.  It was later applied to counter-cultural movement(s) many of which sprang up during the 1960s.
For the first time the printed term "underground"  was used by art-critic Manny Farber (1957).

A way to define it is a quote by Frank Zappa:
"The mainstream comes to you, but you have to go to the underground."

Applied to the arts, the term underground typically means artists who are not corporately sponsored and generally do not want to be.

History
The 1960s and 1970s underground cultural movements had some connections to the "beat generation" which had, in turn, been inspired by the philosophers, artists and poets of the Paris Existentialist movement which gathered around Jean-Paul Sartre and Albert Camus in the years after World War II. Sartre and Camus were members of Combat, a French resistance group formed in 1942 by Henri Frenay. Frenay, Sartre and Camus were all involved in publishing Underground newspapers for the resistance. The French underground culture which inspired Jack Kerouac and Allen Ginsberg in America in the 1940s was steeped in socialist thinking before the cold war began. This, however, was not the monolithic socialism of the totalitarian Soviet state, but rather the free-thinking and expressive socialism of artists and dreamers attempting to re-think society.

Jack Kerouac (In Esquire magazine in 1958)  said:

"The same thing was almost going on in the postwar France of Sartre and Genet and what's more we knew about it—But as to the actual existence of a Beat Generation, chances are it was really just an idea in our minds—We'd stay up 24 hours drinking cup after cup of black coffee, playing record after record of Wardell Gray, Lester Young, Dexter Gordon, Willie Jackson, Lennie Tristano and all the rest, talking madly about that holy new feeling out there in the streets—We'd write stories about some strange beatific Negro hepcat saint with goatee hitchhiking across Iowa with taped up horn bringing the secret message of blowing to other coasts, other cities, like a veritable Walter the Penniless leading an invisible First Crusade—We had our mystic heroes and wrote, nay sung novels about them, erected long poems celebrating the new 'angels' of the American underground—In actuality there was only a handful of real hip swinging cats and what there was vanished mightily swiftly during the Korean War when (and after) a sinister new kind of efficiency appeared in America, maybe it was the result of the universalization of Television and nothing else (the Polite Total Police Control of Dragnet's 'peace' officers) but the beat characters after 1950 vanished into jails and madhouses, or were shamed into silent conformity, the generation itself was shortlived and small in number."  It took a few years more, however, for the culture Kerouac describes to grow in numbers and redefine itself variously as the underground culture or the freak scene etc.

See also
 Alternative culture
 Church of the SubGenius
 Counterculture
 Cult following
 Cyberpunk
 English underground
 History of subcultures in the 20th century
 Notes from Underground
 Neopaganism
 Prague Underground
 Soviet Nonconformist Art
 Ukrainian underground 
 UK Underground
 Underground comix
 Underground film
 Underground Literary Alliance
 Underground music
 Underground press

References

External links

 
1950s neologisms
Subcultures